Keith Rennae McCord (born June 22, 1957) is a former American basketball player.  He played college basketball at the University of Alabama and the University of Alabama at Birmingham.  A tenth-round draft pick of the Philadelphia 76ers, McCord played two games in the National Basketball Association (NBA), scoring four total points.

References

1957 births
Living people
Alabama Crimson Tide men's basketball players
American men's basketball players
Basketball players from Birmingham, Alabama
Philadelphia 76ers draft picks
Shooting guards
UAB Blazers men's basketball players
Washington Bullets players